The 1952–53 NCAA men's basketball season began in December 1952, progressed through the regular season and conference tournaments, and concluded with the 1953 NCAA basketball tournament championship game on March 18, 1953, at Municipal Auditorium in Kansas City, Missouri. The Indiana Hoosiers won their second NCAA national championship with a 69–68 victory over the Kansas Jayhawks.

Rule changes
Teams must take a free throw after a foul, as had been the practice through the 1938–39 season. Previously, under a rule that had been in effect since the 1939–40 season, a team could waive its free throw and instead take the ball at mid-court after a foul.

Season headlines 

 Prior to the season, the NCAA ruled that colleges and universities could no longer count games played against non-collegiate opponents in their annual won-loss records. Previously, it had been a common practice for many years for colleges and universities to include non-collegiate opponents in their schedules, with the games recognized as part of their official record for the season.
 The California Basketball Association began play, with five original members. It would be renamed the West Coast Athletic Conference in 1956 and the West Coast Conference in 1989.
 The NCAA forced Kentucky to suspend its men's basketball program for the entire 1952–53 season as a result of the CCNY point-shaving scandal, which had been revealed in 1951.
 The NCAA tournament expanded from 16 to 22 teams.

Season outlook

Pre-season polls 

The Top 20 from the AP Poll and the UP Coaches Poll during the pre-season.

Conference membership changes

Regular season

Conference winners and tournaments

Statistical leaders

Post-season tournaments

NCAA tournament

Final Four 

 Third Place – Washington 88, LSU 69

National Invitation tournament

Semifinals & finals 

 Third Place – Duquesne 81, Manhattan 67

Awards

Consensus All-American teams

Major player of the year awards 

 Helms Player of the Year: Bob Houbregs, Washington

Other major awards 

 NIT/Haggerty Award (Top player in New York City metro area): Walter Dukes, Seton Hall

Coaching changes 

A number of teams changed coaches during the season and after it ended.

References